DeMoss Springs Park is a park located near Moro, Oregon listed on the National Register of Historic Places.  The site was once the settlement of the DeMoss family, a noted family singing group that toured as the DeMoss Lyric Bards during the period 1872-1912.  The family donated the land to the county as a park in 1897.

See also
 National Register of Historic Places listings in Sherman County, Oregon

References

1897 establishments in Oregon
National Register of Historic Places in Sherman County, Oregon
Parks on the National Register of Historic Places in Oregon
Protected areas established in 1897